The Tiszapolgár culture or Tiszapolgár-Româneşti culture (4500–4000 BC) was an Eneolithic archaeological culture of the Great Hungarian Plain, the Banat, Eastern Slovakia, and Ukrainian Zakarpattia Oblast in Central Europe.

The type site Tiszapolgár-Basatanya is a town in northeastern Hungary (Polgár). It is a continuation of the earlier Neolithic Tisza culture. The type site Româneşti is located in the Româneşti-Tomeşti,Timiș County, Romania.

Most of the information about the Tiszapolgár culture comes from cemeteries; over 150 individual graves have been being excavated at Tiszapolgár-Basatanya. The pottery is unpainted but often polished and frequently decorated.

In 2022 a trove of 169 gold rings was found in Romania, in the burial of a high-status woman belonging to the Tiszapolgár culture. The trove was described as "a sensational find for the period".

Genetics

Lipson et al. (2017) found in the remains of five individuals ascribed to the Tiszapolgár culture three G2a2b and a subclade of it, and two I2a and a subclade of it. Of the five samples of mtDNA extracted, three belonged to T21c, one belonged to H26, and one belonged to H1.

Gallery

See also 
 Prehistory of Transylvania

Bibliography
 
 
 Parkinson, William A. (1999): The Social Organization of Early Copper Age Tribes on the Great Hungarian Plain. University of Michigan
 Parkinson, William A.: Style and Social Interaction in the Early Copper Age of the Great Hungarian Plain. La Tinaja: A Newsletter of Archaeological Ceramics. 13(1):4-7. Ohio State University
 Sarris, Apostolos; Galaty, Michael L.; Yerkes, Richard W.; Parkinson, William A.; Gyucha, Attila; Billingsley, Doc M. & Tate, Robert: Investigation of Hungarian Early Copper Age Settlements through Magnetic Prospection & Soil Phosphate Techniques
 Sauer, Erin: Paleomeander Behavior in the Early Copper Age of the Great Hungarian Plain: Vészt″o,Hungary. The Ohio State University
 The Stone – Copper Age /The Eneolithic Age/Early Phase/5th Millennium BC, bilder av oldstidsgjenstander fra den aktuelle tidsepoke

References

External links
 Tiszapolgár
 The Tiszapolgár culture 
 (in German)
 Trove of Gold Rings Is Uncovered in ‘Sensational’ Prehistoric Grave in Romania

Chalcolithic cultures of Europe
Archaeological cultures of Central Europe
Archaeological cultures in Hungary
Archaeological cultures in Romania
Archaeological cultures in Serbia
Archaeological cultures in Slovakia
Archaeological cultures in Ukraine
Eneolithic Serbia
Prehistory of Southeastern Europe